Wellin is a municipality of Wallonia located in the province of Luxembourg, Belgium.

On 1 January 2007 the municipality, which covers 67.52 km2, had 2,958 inhabitants, giving a population density of 43.8 inhabitants per km2.

The municipality consists of the following districts: Chanly, Halma, Lomprez, Sohier, and Wellin. Other population centers include: Barzin, Froidlieu, Fays-Famenne, and Neupont.

References

External links
 
Official website (in French)
 Bibliotheque communale de Wellin (in French)
 Graffiti from Wellin

Municipalities of Luxembourg (Belgium)